Lofthus is a village in the municipality of Ullensvang, which is located in the Hardanger region of Vestland county, Norway. The village lies along the eastern shore of the Sørfjorden, along Norwegian National Road 13.

Lofthus is a tourist area with hotels and camping sites. There is also a significant amount of fruit farming in the area, and so Lofthus is home to a national fruit research centre.  The most popular fruit grown in this area is the cherry. The medieval Ullensvang Church is located in this village, as is the Hardanger folk high school.

Notable people
Notable people that were born or lived in Lofthus include:
Halldor O. Opedal (1895–1986), folkorist

Media gallery

References

Ullensvang
Villages in Vestland